Skontzopoulos Theatre was a theatre in Athens in Greece, active in 1835–1837. It was the first modern theatre in Athens established after the Greek War of Independence, and the first to function in the city after antiquity.

It was founded on Kotzia Square, were a theater company under Athanasios Skontzopoulos had performed with an all-male cast from 1835. In 1836, the temporary structure was changed to a permanent one. It was the first modern theatre in Athens. It was replaced by the Meli theatre in 1837, which made a sensation and introduced the first female actresses on the Greek stage, but was also temporary. Athens was not given a permanent theatre until the foundation of the Boukoura Theatre (1840–1897).

References

«Η αρχιτεκτονική του νεοελληνικού θεάτρου:1720-1940» Φέσσα Εμμανουήλ Ελένη, διδακτορική διατριβή, (1990) http://thesis.ekt.gr/thesisBookReader/id/1372#page/1/mode/2up

Theatres in Athens
1830s in Greece
1835 establishments in Greece
Theatre in Greece
19th century in Athens